Devil's Pool is a natural pool at the confluence of three streams near Babinda, Queensland, Australia.

Devil's Pool or Devil's pool may also refer to:

Devil's Pool (Victoria Falls), a natural pool at the edge of Victoria Falls, Africa that is occasionally safe for swimming
Devil's Pool (Pennsylvania) the section of Cresheim Creek just before its confluence with Wissahickon Creek in Philadelphia
Devil's pool (billiards), a form of pool (pocket billiards) native to Australia, making use of upright obelisk-like "pins" as targets and/or obstacles, depending upon game variant
The Devil's Pool, the title generally given to English translations of George Sand's novel La Mare au diable